Ummeliata is a genus of Asian sheet weavers that was first described by Embrik Strand in 1942.

Species
 it contains ten species:
Ummeliata angulituberis (Oi, 1960) – Russia, Korea, Japan
Ummeliata erigonoides (Oi, 1960) – Japan
Ummeliata feminea (Bösenberg & Strand, 1906) – Russia, China, Korea, Japan
Ummeliata insecticeps (Bösenberg & Strand, 1906) (type) – Russia to Vietnam, Taiwan, Japan
Ummeliata jambi Tanasevitch, 2020 – Indonesia (Sumatra)
Ummeliata onoi Saito, 1993 – Japan
Ummeliata osakaensis (Oi, 1960) – Russia, Japan
Ummeliata saitoi Matsuda & Ono, 2001 – Japan
Ummeliata sibirica (Eskov, 1980) – Russia
Ummeliata xiaowutai Han & Zhang, 2014 – China

See also
 List of Linyphiidae species (Q–Z)

References

Araneomorphae genera
Linyphiidae
Spiders of Asia
Spiders of Russia
Taxa named by Embrik Strand